is a town in Sōya Subprefecture, Hokkaido, Japan.

The name comes from the Ainu word Esaushi, meaning "cape" (in the geographic sense).

Geography

Esashi is located at the southeast tip of Sōya Subprefectures. The town faces the Sea of Okhotsk to the east, the town of Utanobori to the west, the town of Bifuka to the southwest, Ōmu to the south, and Hamatonbetsu to the north. The southern border of the city is marked by the Toinai River, and the north is marked by Cape Kamui.

The residential districts of Esashi are on a long, narrow strip of the coast ranging from north to south; 67.08% of the town is forested, 14.7% is unused plain land, and only .44% of the town consists of residential land.

Climate
Esashi has a humid continental climate (Köppen: Dfb).

History 

Esashi District was established in 1869 in Kitami Province (1868-1882), a short-lived province in the north of Hokkaido. The district was historically under the control of the Kaga Domain on Honshu; this control ended in 1870.

It consisted of four villages: Esashi, Tonbetsu, Utanobori and Rebun Village (礼文村, apparently unrelated to the town of Rebun on Rebun Island) In September, 1891 a town hall for the 3 villages set up.
April, 1909 :Esashi Village becomes a second-class municipality
April, 1916 :Tonbetsu Village (now Hamatonbetsu Town) split off
April, 1923 :Esashi becomes a first-class municipality
September, 1939: Utanobori Village (now town) split off
October, 1947: Esashi was elevated to town status.
On March 20, 2006, the town of Utanobori was merged into Esashi for the second time.

Mascot

He is a bright and energetic fairy who loves the forest and the sea and the taste of the horsehair crab. As such, he customized his hat with the things he likes. He is unveiled in 2011. He is created by Ayumi Shozaki of Osaka.

References

External links

Official Website 

 
Towns in Hokkaido